is a bay located in the Chūbu region of Japan, and spans the coasts of Kyoto Prefecture, and Fukui Prefecture.

Geography
Wakasa Bay is the area south of the straight line from Cape Kyoga on the west of Tango Peninsula to Cape Echizen on the east Echizen town.

Border communities
Fukui prefecture
Echizen town, Minamiechizen, Tsuruga, Mihama, Wakasa, Obama, Ōi, Takahama
Kyoto prefecture
Maizuru, Miyazu, Yosano, Ine, Kyōtango

Rivers
Yura, Shono, Saburi, etc.

Development

Ports

Military facilities
The Port of Maizuru contains the naval bases of the Japan Maritime Self-Defense Force.

References

Bays of Japan
Bays of the Sea of Japan
Landforms of Fukui Prefecture
Landforms of Kyoto Prefecture